Rana may refer to:

Astronomy
 Rana (crater), a crater on Mars
 Delta Eridani or Rana, a star

People, groups and titles
 Rana (name), a given name and surname (including a list of people and characters with the name)
 Rana (title), a historical title used today as a hereditary name in South Asia
 Rana dynasty, a ruling dynasty in Nepal (1846–1951)
 Rana, a South Asian ethnicity, subgroup of the Tharu people

Places
 Rana, Burkina Faso, a town in Boulkiemdé Province, Burkina Faso
 Raná (Chrudim District), village in Pardubice Region, Czech Republic
 Raná (Louny District), village and municipality in Ústí nad Labem Region, Czech Republic
 Rana, Norway, municipality in Nordland County, Norway
 Råna, a mountain in Møre og Romsdal County, Norway
 Rana Colony, a town in Punjab Province, Pakistan
 Ra'na, a former village in Palestine
 Rana, a medieval principality on Rügen, Germany

Other uses
 Rana (genus), a genus of frogs
 Rana (software), a vocal for the Vocaloid 3 singing voice synthesizer
 Rana language (disambiguation), several languages
 Rana FM, a Canadian Pashto-language radio station
 Rana Institute of Higher Studies, a university in Kabul, Afghanistan
 Rana Plaza, a building in Dhaka, Bangladesh that collapsed in 2013
 Royal Animal Nursing Auxiliary (RANA), a job title - see Paraveterinary worker 
 Rana, an unfinished Indian film by K. S. Ravikumar
 Rana, a pinning position in professional wrestling
 Rana, a codename for an AMD Phenom microprocessor
 RANA, a band formed in New Jersey in the 1990s featuring Scott Metzger

See also
 Raña
 Rane (disambiguation)
 Ranna (disambiguation)